WFC Tornado Kyiv was one of a better Soviet and Ukrainian women's football club from Kyiv. The club was liquidated in 1993.

History
Founded in 1988 as Nyva Baryshivka and competed in several Soviet competitions including the Soviet Top League in 1990 and 1991. The club won the league in 1990 by beating the Russian Tekstilschik Ramenskoye in the final. Next season the club relocated to Kyiv, but managed only to place 8th in its group (out of two).

Following dissolution of the Soviet Union, in 1992 the club entered Ukrainian competitions in which it placed fourth. In 1993, WFC Tornado placed 3rd in the Ukrainian championship.

Titles
 Soviet League
 Winners (1): 1990

 Ukrainian League
 Third (1): 1993
 Ukrainian Cup
 Winners (1): 1992
 Runners-up (1): 1993

References

Defunct women's football clubs in Ukraine
Football clubs in Kyiv
Ukrainian Women's League clubs
1988 establishments in Ukraine
1993 disestablishments in Ukraine
Association football clubs established in 1988
Association football clubs disestablished in 1993